The Moroccan Royal Gymnastics Federation aims to develop, promote and supervise gymnastics in Morocco. Abdessadek Bitari is the president'.

References 

Sports governing bodies in Morocco
Gymnastics in Morocco
Sports organizations established in 1956